Boniface Toroitich Kiprop (born 12 October 1985 in Kapchorwa District) is a track and field athlete from Uganda.

His older brother Martin Toroitich is also a runner, who has featured at the IAAF World Cross Country Championships. Boniface Kiprop is coached by Giuseppe Giambrone and he is actually making part of the Tuscany Training Camp project.

Career
At the 2001 African Junior Championships in Mauritius, he competed in the 5000 and 10000 metres, finishing 1st and 2nd respectively. Two years later the championships were held in Cameroon, and he won both events. At the 2003 All-Africa Games he finished 4th in 10000 metres and 6th in 5000 metres. At the 2003 World Championships in Paris he missed the 5000 metres final. However, he won a bronze medal in the 10,000 m at the 2003 Afro-Asian Games.

At the 2004 World Junior Championships in Athletics in Grosseto, Italy, he won the 10000 metres race and was 5th in 5000 metres. He competed at the 2004 Summer Olympics for his native African country. There he finished fourth in the final of the 10,000 metres. He again finished fourth at the 2005 World Championships, but won a silver medal over 5000 metres at the 3rd IAAF World Athletics Final.

In 2006 he won the 10,000 metres race at the Commonwealth Games.

In August 2004 he set a new 10000 metres World Junior Record, 27:04.00 at the Memorial Van Damme meeting in Brussels. The record was broken by Samuel Wanjiru at the same meeting the next year. Kiprop also holds Ugandan records in 3000, 5000 and 10000 metres.

At the 2007 All-Africa Games he was fifth in 10000 metres.

He finished 10th at 10000 metres at the 2007 World Championships.

References

External links

IAAF, August 25, 2007: Focus on Africa - Boniface Kiprop Toroitich (UGA)

1985 births
Living people
Ugandan male long-distance runners
Olympic male long-distance runners
Olympic athletes of Uganda
Athletes (track and field) at the 2004 Summer Olympics
Athletes (track and field) at the 2008 Summer Olympics
Commonwealth Games medallists in athletics
Commonwealth Games gold medallists for Uganda
Athletes (track and field) at the 2002 Commonwealth Games
Athletes (track and field) at the 2006 Commonwealth Games
African Games competitors for Uganda
Athletes (track and field) at the 2003 All-Africa Games
Athletes (track and field) at the 2007 All-Africa Games
World Athletics Championships athletes for Uganda
People from Kapchorwa District
Medallists at the 2006 Commonwealth Games